Rangeilunda Airport, also known as Brahmapur Airport , is a domestic airport serving the city of Berhampur (also known as Brahmapur) in Odisha, India. The airstrip was built by the British during World War II.

The airport is spread over 40 acres and is under the control of the State Public Works Department. The runway is 750 meters (2,461 ft) long and is periodically maintained by the Government of Odisha. There is one suitable helipad too for facilitating helicopter services.

The runway is currently used by the defence establishment, State Government, private companies and VIPs to reach Berhampur and other places in South Odisha. The State's second flying training Institute is coming up at the airport. The airport was designated to be developed as a regional airport under the government's UDAN scheme in 2018. In view of this, it started commercial operations from 5 March 2023.

Development
The civic authority in consultation with the Town and Country Planning Organisation has developed a Comprehensive Development Plan for the expansion of the city, which also includes a new greenfield airport at a different location other than the present airstrip, as the Airports Authority of India (AAI) has expressed concerns over expansion obstacles that would be faced by the authorities if in case of expansion. The airport has been designated to be developed as a regional airport the government's UDAN scheme in 2018.

The expansion plan includes to develop the airport in three phases, in which the first phase including a passenger terminal for serving commercial traffic has been completed. The runway is capable of handling 9 to 10-seater aircraft like the Cessna 208 Caravan aircraft. 
The second phase includes a new Air Traffic Control (ATC) tower and regular scheduled flight operations from Berhampur Airport. 
The final third phase will involve the expansion of the airport and operating flights with larger aircraft.

At present, the airport has been approved for handling non-scheduled commercial flights by the Government of Odisha, and the new low-cost regional airline, IndiaOne Air, began to operate from the airport to Bhubaneswar two times per week, from 5 March 2023.

Airlines and destinations

References

External links
 2ND TRAINING CENTRE AT RANGEILUNDA

Airports in Odisha
Berhampur
1940s establishments in British India
Airports with year of establishment missing